Aphomia curvicostella is a species of snout moth in the genus Aphomia. It was described by Hans Zerny in 1914. It is found in Russia.

The length of the forewings is 12–15 mm.

References

Moths described in 1914
Tirathabini
Moths of Asia